Newington is a census-designated place (CDP) in Fairfax County, Virginia, United States. The population was 12,943 at the 2010 census. The 2010 census showed a significant decrease after half the population was split off to the newly created Newington Forest CDP.

While the ZIP code for Newington is 22122, this is only for delivery points within the post office itself. Homes and businesses in the CDP have Springfield or Lorton street addresses.

Geography
Newington is located in southern Fairfax County at  (38.735414, −77.203558). It is bordered to the north by Springfield, to the northeast by Franconia and Kingstowne, to the east and southeast by Fort Belvoir, to the southwest by Lorton, to the west by Newington Forest, and to the northwest by West Springfield. Interstate 95 passes through the middle of the CDP, with access from Exit 166 (Virginia Route 286, the Fairfax County Parkway). The Fairfax County Parkway leads northwest  to Interstate 66 between Fairfax and Centreville.

History
The community of Newington derives its name from the second glebe house of Truro Parish, completed in 1760 and so named after becoming the private residence of Richard and Sarah McCarty Chichester sometime after 1767. The house itself was purchased by the family of William Nevitt, in 1828, along with 1000 acres of land; they occupied the building until it burned in 1875. The Alexandria and Fredericksburg Railway opened a railway station on the property in April 1872. Originally known as the Long Branch Station and later renamed Accotink and then Newington, it was closed in 1971; it is remembered by a historic marker erected by the Fairfax County History Commission in 2005. Also in the Newington area are the remains of the Mount Air plantation, originally granted to Dennis McCarty in 1727. The house was destroyed by fire in 1992, but ruins remain; they, too, are denoted by a historic marker, erected in 2006, and are owned by the Fairfax County Park Authority, which interprets the site.

Demographics
As of the census of 2000, there were 19,784 people, 6,710 households, and 5,321 families residing in the CDP. The racial makeup of the CDP was 67.80% White, 12.83% African American, 0.26% Native American, 11.66% Asian, 0.08% Pacific Islander, 2.66% from other races, and 4.71% from two or more races. Hispanic or Latino of any race were 7.98% of the population.

There were 6,710 households, out of which 43.4% had children under the age of 18 living with them, 66.6% were married couples living together, 9.7% had a female householder with no husband present, and 20.7% were non-families. 15.7% of all households were made up of individuals, and 5.0% had someone living alone who was 65 years of age or older. The average household size was 2.93 and the average family size was 3.28.

In the CDP, the population was spread out, with 28.5% under the age of 18, 6.3% from 18 to 24, 32.3% from 25 to 44, 26.1% from 45 to 64, and 6.8% who were 65 years of age or older. The median age was 36 years. For every 100 females, there were 96.1 males. For every 100 females age 18 and over, there were 91.9 males.

According to a 2007 estimate, the median income for a household in the CDP was $112,675, and the median income for a family was $119,001. Males had a median income of $58,203 versus $41,177 for females. The per capita income for the CDP was $32,901. About 1.3% of families and 2.1% of the population were below the poverty line, including 2.3% of those under age 18 and 2.2% of those age 65 or over.

Education
Fairfax County Public Schools operates public schools in the county.

Fairfax County Public Library operates the Kingstowne Library.

Climate
The climate in this area is characterized by hot, humid summers and generally cool to cold winters with moderate snowfall. Blizzards and major snowstorms are rare but not nonexistent, while summer thunderstorms are very common. According to the Köppen Climate Classification system, Newington has a "humid subtropical climate", abbreviated "Cfa" on climate maps.

References

External links
Newberry Station Homeowners Association
Raceway Farms Homeowners Association

Springfield, Virginia
Census-designated places in Fairfax County, Virginia
Census-designated places in Virginia
Washington metropolitan area